Castle Rock is a conspicuous rock,  high, lying  off the west side of Snow Island, in the South Shetland Islands. This descriptive name dates back to 1822 and is now established in international usage.

References

 

Rock formations of Antarctica